The Peugeot Type 8 was a small four-seater runabout produced by Peugeot from 1893 to 1896.  The engine displaced 1282 cc and was carried over from the Peugeot Type 7, though the Type 8 was otherwise mechanically different from the Type 7.  Total production figures are unknown.

References

1890s cars
Type 8
Rear-engined vehicles
Vehicles introduced in 1893